Pierre Charton (14 November 1904 – 1 March 1986) was a French racing cyclist. He rode in the 1928 Tour de France.

References

1904 births
1986 deaths
French male cyclists
Place of birth missing